Alexey Aleksandrovich Dobrovolsky (also known as Dobroslav; October 13, 1938 – May 19, 2013) was a Soviet-Russian ideologue of Slavic neopaganism, a founder of Russian Rodnoverie, national anarchist, neo-Nazi, and volkhv of the Nature Conservation Society "Strely Yarily" (Arrows of Yarila). 

He called his ideology "Russian National Socialism". He was the spiritual leader of the radical wing of Russian neopaganism.

Dobrovolsky was the author of the self-published article “Arrows of Yarila” for neopagans. In the 1950s-1960s, he was a member of the dissident movement of the USSR and the National Alliance of Russian Solidarists (NTS).

Biography 
Dobrovolsky grew up admiring Stalin and everything that was associated with him. From an early age, he participated in various dissident movements.

After finishing high school, Dobrovolsky received an incomplete education at the Moscow Institute of Culture and worked as a loader in the printing house of the newspaper "Moskovskaya Pravda".

In 1956, he left the Komsomol in protest against the campaign that had begun in the country to overcome the consequences of Joseph Stalin's cult of personality. He says, “From the exposure of Stalin, I drew the wrong conclusions and gradually became an enemy of Soviet power."

In December 1956, influenced by the anti-communist Hungarian Revolution, he formed the Russian National Socialist Party from the young workers of the defense factories in Moscow, aiming to overthrow the communists and "revive the Russian nation". The group members were mainly involved in distributing leaflets with anti-Soviet and anti-communist slogans.

On May 23, 1958, he was arrested along with his associates from the RNSP and sentenced to three years in prison. In custody, he became friends with former collaborators, Nazis, associates of Pyotr Krasnov, Andrei Shkuro, and Andrey Vlasov, and members of the National Alliance of Russian Solidarists (NTS). Influenced by them in the camp between 1958–1961, he became a monarchist. While serving time in Dubravny camps (Mordovia), Dobrovolsky met S. R. Arseniev-Hoffman, who, in the pre-war years, was a member of a secret Russian-German society.

He was released in 1961. The same year, he was baptized by the dissident priest Gleb Yakunin.

In 1964 he joined the Union of the Working People, an organization created by Boris Evdokimov, a member of the NTS. In March 1964, because of a provocateur, all four members of the union were arrested. Dobrovolsky and Evdokimov were declared mentally ill, and Dobrovolsky underwent psychiatric treatment for a year. At the hospital, he met dissidents Vladimir Bukovsky and General Petro Grigorenko.

On August 25, 1965, he was released from a special psychiatric hospital. In the autumn, the NTS established a connection with him, which, through him, transferred the duplicating apparatus to the dissident poet Yuri Galanskov, a member of the NTS. In 1966, Dobrovolsky joined the NTS. Through him, Alexander Ginzburg's "White Book" (a collection of documents about the trial of Andrei Sinyavsky and Yuli Daniel) and the collection "Phoenix-66" were transferred to the West.

In 1967 he was arrested again. At the Trial of the Four, he testified against himself and his comrades, being sentenced to only two years (while Galanskov received seven years and died in the camp, and Ginzburg was sentenced to five years). Anatoly Krasnov-Levitin wrote in his memoirs: “The most sensational news was that of the surrender of Alexey Dobrovolsky. For a long time, no one wanted to believe this. Dobrovolsky, with his mannerisms - either a white officer or a hero of the people's will - managed to inspire universal confidence in himself."

In January 1968, Pyotr Yakir, Yuliy Kim, and Ilya Gabay, calling Dobrovolsky "mean and cowardly" in their address "To the workers of science, culture, art", wrote:

In early 1969, Dobrovolsky was released. He lived in Uglich and Alexandrov. In 1972 he again received a residence permit in Moscow. At this time, he became interested in occultism and Slavic paganism.

In 1986 he left Moscow for Pushchino, where he was engaged in folk healing.

In the second half of the 1980s, with the beginning of Perestroika, he joined the patriotic association Pamyat. Dobrovolsky was involved in a dispute with the leader of the association, Dmitry Vasilyev, when Orthodox sentiments prevailed in the association. At the end of 1987, he moved with a group of neopagans to the World Anti-Zionist and Anti-Masonic Front "Pamyat", headed by Valery Yemelyanov (Velemir).

In 1989, he took part in the creation of the "Moscow Slavic Pagan Community", which was headed by Alexander Belov ("Selidor"). He took the pagan name "Dobroslav". At this time, he actively delivered lectures organized by Konstantin Smirnov-Ostashvili, a leader of the Union for National Proportional Representation "Pamyat". Dobroslav took an active part in national patriot rallies. In 1990, he collaborated with the Russian Party of Viktor Korchagin.

Since the beginning of the 1990s, he retired to the village of Vasenyovo, Kirov Oblast, where he conducted "educational" work: he performed naming ceremonies and organized "pagan" holidays. During the latter, there was often an abundant use of alcohol and demonstrative destruction of icons. In Vasenyovo, Dobroslav founded a pagan community mainly from his family members. One of his sons, Alexander, received the pagan name Vyatich. In 1993–1995, Dobroslav gave "educational lectures" in Kirov at the House of Political Education.

In 1994, he tried to create a political organization, the Russian National Liberation Movement (RNOD), an idea that his student A. M. Aratov later also unsuccessfully tried to implement. On June 22, 1997, Dobroslav convened the "Veche - Unification Congress of Pagan Communities", proclaiming himself the leader of the RNOD. Later, he came into conflict with the publishers of Russkaya Pravda, who had previously actively disseminated his ideas. Aratov expelled Dobroslav's son Sergei from the editorial board of Russkaya Pravda for "drunkenness."

In July 1999, Dobroslav was elected Supreme Volkhv of the Union of Slavic Native Belief Communities (headed by Vadim Kazakov from Kaluga).

The "Arrows of Yarila" cultural-historical society, created by Dobroslav's followers, collapsed in the early 2000s since the individualist Dobroslav could no longer lead it.

In March 2001, Sergei (Rodostav) was elected head of the administration of the Shabalinsky district. In the early 2000s, Dobroslav concentrated on developing a pagan worldview. He came to Moscow several times to give lectures.

On April 23, 2001, the Shabalinsky District Court considered the case of Dobroslav, who was accused of inciting antisemitism and religious hatred. The local communist newspaper Kirovskaya Pravda supported Dobroslav. On March 1, 2002, this case was considered in the Svechinsky District Court of the city of Kirov, where Dobroslav was sentenced to two years of probation.

In March, May, and July 2005, some of Dobroslav's brochures were declared extremist material by various district courts of Kirov. In 2007, these brochures were included in the Federal List of Extremist Materials, compiled by the Federal Registration Service (No. 6-10).

Ideas 
According to Dobrovolsky and people who knew him, Nazi ideas, coupled with Nazi symbolism and "great style", made a deep impression on him in the 1960s. He began to dream of the complete extermination of the Jews. Dobrovolsky's new friends, Nazis and collaborators, convinced him that the Americans allegedly built the gas chambers themselves to accuse the Nazis of genocide. From S. R. Arsenyev-Hoffman, Dobrovolsky learned about the "faith of the ancestors" and the role of the "Nordic race". Later, in 1969, having bought a library of rare books, he became interested in paganism and the occult and became a supporter of the esoteric ideas of Helena Blavatsky.

Dobroslav represented the "National Socialist" wing in Rodnoverie and enjoyed great prestige among the national patriots. He was proud that he did not have a higher education because he believed that "education cripples a person" (an opinion shared by Adolf Hitler). In his opinion, science is currently at an impasse, and "it only causes misfortune". Dobroslav referred to himself and his followers as "bearers of light" and "healthy forces of the nation".

Dobroslav declared himself a supporter of "pagan socialism". He derived "Russian spirituality" directly from the "Slavic heredity", closely connected with his native soil. He interpreted the concept of blood and soil literally, believing that some powerful material force emanates from the ancestors' graves that influences the fate of the living. As a National Socialist ("pagan socialist"), he placed the most value not on Slavs or Russians as a nation but on the Russian commune. In the pre-Christian period, the Slavs supposedly did not have druzhinas separated from the people. Dobroslav traced this concept to "Russian natural peasant socialism", allegedly including complete social equality, equalization, redistribution of property, voluntary self-restraint, and not recognizing the right to private property.

Borrowing the idea of vegetarianism from esoteric teachings, he believed that the introduction of cattle breeding first undermined the harmonious relationship between humanity and animals. He blamed the "Semitic-Hamites" who came from Atlantis for the invention of animal domestication and blood sacrifice. He considered the Jews ("Zhyds") to be a qualitatively different civilization, experiencing absolute hostility to nature, in contrast to all the “indigenous peoples” of the world. In the Bible, nature is allegedly depicted not as a "nursing mother" but as an insensitive material shell. He called the Jews parasites and supported pogroms as "forced people's self-defense".

Dobroslav considered the "Zhyd-Christian alienation from nature" and "the church's justification of social inequality" unacceptable. He wrote about the "unnatural mixing of races" and accused "international Zhyd-Christianity" of this crime. He considered the Slavs a special race suffering from racial oppression by "God's chosen people". Following the guidelines of the German Nazis, Dobroslav contrasted "two mutually exclusive worldviews: solar life-affirmation and pernicious obscurantism". He replaced "Aryans" and "Semites" with Slavs and hybrid "Zhyd-Christians": the former are honest and sincere, the latter are crafty and treacherous. At the same time, he borrowed the idea of the "Synagogue of Satan" from Christian antisemitism, associating with it a pentagram, or five-pointed star, supposedly a symbol of evil and Freemasonry. Allegedly, the pagan Slavs were peaceful, and only Prince Vladimir introduced the custom of human sacrifice, while Christians are bloodthirsty. Dobroslav saw its roots in “biblical punitive wars against the indigenous peoples of Palestine”. He argued that "the misanthropic racism of the 'God-chosen' Zhyds served as a model for Christian racism - for the extermination of entire native peoples". Monotheism, according to Dobroslav, contributed to the consolidation of princely and royal power and ultimately led to serfdom. In his opinion, the Russian Civil War, which split the people into nobility and commoners, began not in 1918 but in 988. According to Dobroslav, the church committed a terrible betrayal of national interests by allying with the Tatars, which allegedly helped it to strengthen itself. He denied the patriotic activities of Sergius of Radonezh and tried to prove that the Russians defeated Mamai not with the church's support but despite it.

Dobrovolsky, under his views, singled out the anti-heroes of Russian history. The central place in this blacklist was assigned to Prince Vladimir Svyatoslavich. Dobroslav developed one of the most ideologically significant Russian neopagan myths about the Jewish-Khazar origin of the baptizer of Rus', because of which he introduced Christianity, an instrument for the enslavement of the "Aryans" by the Jews. Dobroslav borrowed this idea from the book "Dezionization" by Valery Yemelyanov, one of the founders of Russian neopaganism. Dobroslav repeated the first part of this myth without changes. Vladimir was the son of Prince Svyatoslav from Malusha, the housekeeper of his mother, Princess Olga. Yemelyanov and Dobroslav stated that the name Malusha is derived from the Jewish name Malka. They claimed that Malusha's father was a "rabbi" who bore the Hebrew name Malk, a native of the Khazar Jews. The "Nesterov censorship" of the Christian period, carried out on the supposedly existing pre-Christian chronicles, distorted the "rabbinich" in relation to Vladimir into "robichich" (the son of a slave - Malusha). Dobroslav supplemented the second part of the myth about the deeds of Vladimir with new details. Dobrovolsky considered Byzantium the main culprit for the introduction of Christianity in Rus'. According to Dobroslav, Vladimir introduced the Inquisition and carried out propaganda of alcoholism that had arisen during his reign. The result of the prince's reign was the Slavs' spiritual disarmament, the reduction of their numbers, and the inability to resist the hordes of the Mongol Tatars.

Dobroslav did not believe in Perun and other gods, believing that the ancestors did not believe in gods but in spirits and honored their kind. The statues of Perun and other gods, according to him, were placed in Kyiv during the time of Vladimir Svyatoslavich at the instigation of the Jews in order to discredit paganism with bloody sacrifices and prepare the people for the introduction of Christianity.

Capitalism, according to Dobroslav, is "a monstrous offspring of Zhyd-Christianity" and a "Western plutocracy, which is the result of the internal development of Zhyd-Christianity": "capitalism and conscience are incompatible". For this reason, modern industrial society has brought the world to the brink of ecological catastrophe, and nature will severely avenge this. Like the Nazis, Dobroslav believed that the townspeople had betrayed national values and become bourgeois, but contrary to the Nazis, he saw the Russian Revolution as the uprising of the village against the city and "Russian truth against the Zhyd-Christian falsehood". He called Bolshevism "the element of the Russian soul" and contrasted it with Marxism. In declaring the Russian Revolution "an attempt to return to [Russia's] natural independent path," Dobroslav revived such concepts as national bolshevism and Eurasianism, which were popular in the 1920s among some white Russian émigrés. Dobroslav called for an alliance of nationalists and "patriotic communists" in the name of building "Russian national socialism".

Dobroslav saw salvation for the Slavs in "a return to the very core of the bright pagan worldview - to the highly moral attitudes of the ancients, primarily in relation to Mother Nature". Dobroslav declared an uncompromising war on the "Zhyd yoke" and prophesied an imminent Russian revolt against it. He wrote that the Yarilo-Sun would soon burn those most sensitive to ultraviolet radiation, a trait which he attributed primarily to the Jews. In his opinion, the "Zhyd-Christian" world will mark the beginning of "our new era". Only the "new people", the sun-worshipers, can survive.

In the early 1990s, Dobroslav was the first to call the four-beam swastika "Kolovrat" and later transferred this name to the eight-beam rectangular swastika he introduced. According to the historian and religious scholar R. V. Shizhensky, Dobroslav took the idea of the swastika from the work of the Nazi ideologist Herman Wirth, the first leader of the Ahnenerbe. Dobrovolsky introduced the eight-beam "kolovrat" as a symbol of "resurgent paganism." Dobroslav declared the eight-beam "Kolovrat", supposedly a pagan sign of the Sun, consisting of two superimposed swastikas, the symbol of an uncompromising "national liberation struggle" against the "Zhyd yoke". According to Dobroslav, the meaning of "Kolovrat" entirely coincides with the meaning of the Nazi swastika. The eight-beam "kolovrat" accompanies many of Dobroslav's publications.

Influence 
Dobroslav's ideas had a significant impact on Russian Rodnovery. Most of his ideas have become commonplace variations of Rodnoverie. Many of these ideas, created earlier by neopagans, became known to the next generation through Dobroslav, including the understanding of the tribal system as "Aryan" socialism (National Socialism); opposition of Slavs and "Zhyd-Christians", antisemitic ideas, including the introduction of bloody sacrifices by Jews, anti-natural activities and "racism" of the Old Testament and modern Jews; the treacherous activity of Prince Vladimir in the introduction of Christianity; the imminent onset of a new era (the Age of Aquarius), favorable for the Slavs and disastrous for their enemies.

Dobroslav introduced the term and meaning of the eight-beam "Kolovrat", the most popular symbol of Rodnoverie. Dobroslav's idea of an alliance between nationalists and "patriotic communists" became the basis for the aspiration of some neopagans for an alliance with "nationally oriented" communists.

Dobroslav's follower, A. M. Aratov, director of the Russkaya Pravda publishing house, wrote about the onset of the "Era of Russia" and the imminent end of Christianity and Judaism.

Dobrovolsky appears as a potential leader of Russia in The New Order: Last Days of Europe, a game mod for the 2016 computer strategy game Hearts of Iron IV. In the plot of the mod, Nazi Germany won World War II. The Nazi warlord state of the Aryan Brotherhood is located on the territory of Perm (renamed Permhaym), created and led by Russians who declared themselves "Aryans" under the leadership of Dobrovolsky, who renamed himself Gutrum Vagner. This state enslaved and partially exterminated Slavic "subhumans" in its territory and implanted German culture. In a scenario for the Aryan Brotherhood, Valery Yemelyanov, who renamed himself Zigfrid Shultz and later Velimir, seizes power and creates Hyperborea, a totalitarian theocratic state with a neopagan ideology, according to which the "Slavic-Aryans" are the "superior race". All foreigners and those Slavs who do not accept the new ideology are turned into slaves. A policy of "dezionization" is being pursued. In reality, Dobrovolsky and Yemelyanov were among the founders of Russian neopaganism.

References

Sources 

 
 
 
 
 
 
 
 
 
 
 
 
 
 
 
 

Soviet dissidents
Russian Holocaust deniers
Russian neo-Nazis
Russian modern pagans
Russian nationalists
2013 deaths
1938 births